Cora Campbell (born May 28, 1974 in Montreal, Quebec) is a Canadian water polo player. She is a graduate of the University of Calgary. She was part of the 5th place women's water polo team at the 2000 Summer Olympics and was part of the bronze medal winning women's water polo team at the 2001 world championships in Fukuoka, Japan.  She was a member of the 7th place Canadian women's water polo team at the 2004 Summer Olympics. She graduated from Riverdale High School. Her coach Pat Oaten is also a coach at the Dollard-des-Ormeaux Civic Center.

See also
 Canada women's Olympic water polo team records and statistics
 List of World Aquatics Championships medalists in water polo

External links
 

1974 births
Living people
Canadian female water polo players
Water polo players at the 2000 Summer Olympics
Water polo players at the 2004 Summer Olympics
Olympic water polo players of Canada
Water polo players from Montreal
Anglophone Quebec people
University of Calgary alumni
World Aquatics Championships medalists in water polo
Water polo players at the 2007 Pan American Games
Pan American Games silver medalists for Canada
Pan American Games medalists in water polo
Medalists at the 2007 Pan American Games